The Girl Who Believes in Miracles is a 2021 American Christian drama film directed and produced by Richard Correll. The film stars Mira Sorvino, Peter Coyote, Austyn Johnson, and Kevin Sorbo. The Girl Who Believes in Miracles was released on April 2, 2021, produced by 120 dB Films, Gerson Productions, The Mustard Seed Production, and Trailmaker Productions. It was distributed by Atlas Distribution Company.

Premise 
A young girl heals a bird, seemingly simply through prayer, and becomes a national celebrity when more miracles are attributed to her, while dying of an inoperable brain tumor.

Cast 
 Mira Sorvino as Binnie Hopkins
 Kevin Sorbo as Dr. Ben Riley
 Peter Coyote as Sam Donovan
 Tommi Rose as Cindy Kramer
 Austyn Johnson as  Sara Hopkins
 Darryl Cox as Pastor Jerry ‘Mac’ Macmillan
 Burgess Jenkins as Alex Hopkins
 Paul-Mikel Williams as Mark Miller
 David Burkhart as Reporter

Release 
The film was theatrically released in the United States on April 2, 2021.

Home media
The film was released on digital platforms on June 1, 2021.

References

External links 
 
 

2021 films
2021 drama films
2020s English-language films
American drama films
Films about children
Films about Christianity
Films about families
Films shot in Oklahoma
Films set in hospitals
Religious drama films
Resurrection in film
2020s American films